The KT90 is a vacuum tube used in audio applications. Typically, it is used in hi-fi or electric guitar amplifier applications. KT90 was developed by Elektronska Industrija Niš (Ei). KT90 is designed by Blagomir Bukumira,a leading engineer at Ei

Features 
The KT90, or in full, "Kinkless Tetrode 90", is a beam power tetrode and features the same octal socket as its smaller variant, the KT88. It may therefore be used as a substitute, given appropriate re-biasing when used in push-pull configuration.

The KT90 is currently manufactured by Electro-Harmonix, who claim that, despite its different construction, it possesses similar sound characteristics to the EL34 valve. Semi-formal research has been conducted by U.K. supplier Watford Valves who have published a test report. (This research is described here as "semi-formal" because it consists primarily of listening evaluations which may be subjective, rather than electrical analyses of performance parameters in either numerical or graphical form.)

References

Vacuum tubes
Guitar amplification tubes